This article is a list of historic places in Montreal, entered on the Canadian Register of Historic Places, whether they are federal, provincial, or municipal. All addresses are the administrative Region 06. For all other listings in the province of Quebec, see List of historic places in Quebec.

List of historic places

See also
List of National Historic Sites of Canada in Montreal

 
Historic places
Montreal
Montreal